Triplophysa herzensteini is a species of ray-finned fish in the genus Triplophysa , it is placed in the subgenus Labiatophysa which is regarded by some authorities a valid genus.

References
 

herzensteini
Taxa named by Lev Berg
Fish described in 1909